The All-Star Futures Game is an annual baseball exhibition game hosted by Major League Baseball (MLB) as part of its midsummer All-Star Game festivities. From 1999 to 2018, a team of prospects from the United States (excluding Puerto Rico) competed against a team of prospects from other countries around the world and Puerto Rico. In 2019, the format shifted to a team of players from American League organizations against players from National League organizations. Over 800 players have been selected to participate in the All-Star Futures game since its first installment in 1999.

United States team (1999–2018)

Pitchers

 Nick Adenhart (2006)
 Kurt Ainsworth (2000)
 Brett Anderson (2008)
 Ryan Anderson (1999–2000)
 Shaun Anderson (2018)
 Rick Ankiel (1999)
 Mark Appel (2015)
 Jake Arrieta (2008)
 Homer Bailey (2006)
 Brad Baker (2002)
 Collin Balester (2007)
 Anthony Banda (2016)
 Matt Barnes (2012)
 Trevor Bauer (2012)
 Josh Beckett (2000)
 Tyler Beede (2015)
 Phil Bickford (2016)
 Jesse Biddle (2013)
 Christian Binford (2014)
 Joe Blanton (2004)
 Travis Bowyer (2005)
 Archie Bradley (2013)
 Bobby Bradley (2000)
 Zach Britton (2010)
 Clay Buchholz (2007)
 Mark Buehrle (2000)
 Bryan Bullington (2004)
 Madison Bumgarner (2009)
 Dylan Bundy (2012)
 A. J. Burnett (1999)
 Sean Burnett (2002)
 Beau Burrows (2017)
 Eddie Butler (2013)
 Mike Bynum (2000)
 Trevor Cahill (2008)
 Matt Cain (2004)
 Dylan Cease (2018)
 Joba Chamberlain (2007)
 J. T. Chargois (2016)
 Scott Chiasson (2001)
 A. J. Cole (2013)
 Gerrit Cole (2012)
 Aaron Cook (2002)
 Nate Cornejo (2001)
 Jarred Cosart (2010–2011)
 Neal Cotts (2003)
 Kyle Crick (2013)
 John Danks (2004)
 Zach Davies (2015)
 Thomas Diamond (2005)
 Ryan Dittfurth (2002)
 Kyle Drabek (2009)
 Danny Duffy (2009)
 Zach Duke (2005)
 Jon Duplantier (2017)
 J. D. Durbin (2003)
 C. J. Edwards (2015)
 Brett Evert (2002)
 Clint Everts (2004)
 Jack Flaherty (2017)
 Gavin Floyd (2003–2004)
 Christian Friedrich (2010)
 Carson Fulmer (2016)
 Amir Garrett (2015–2016)
 Matt Garza (2007)
 Kyle Gibson (2011)
 Lucas Giolito (2014–2015)
 Marco Gonzales (2014)
 Gio González (2006)
 Tom Gorzelanny (2006)
 Hunter Greene (2018)
 Zack Greinke (2003)
 Foster Griffin (2017)
 Jason Grilli (1999)
 Taylor Guerrieri (2013)
 Josh Hader (2016)
 Hunter Harvey (2014)
 Matt Harvey (2011)
 Jeremy Hellickson (2010)
 Jimmy Herget (2017)
 Jason Hirsh (2006)
 Luke Hochevar (2007)
 Jeff Hoffman (2016)
 Brent Honeywell (2017)
 Dakota Hudson (2018)
 Daniel Hudson (2010)
 Phil Hughes (2006)
 Danny Hultzen (2012)
 Eric Hurley (2006)
 Will Inman (2008)
 Edwin Jackson (2003)
 Zach Jackson (2005)
 Bobby Jenks (2005)
 Kevin Jepsen (2008)
 Taylor Jordan (2013)
 Jimmy Journell (2002)
 Josh Karp (2002)
 Mitch Keller (2018)
 Casey Kelly (2009)
 Clayton Kershaw (2007)
 Michael Kopech (2017)
 Chris Lambert (2005)
 Preston Larrison (2003)
 Mat Latos (2009)
 Anthony Lerew (2005)
 Brad Lincoln (2009)
 Matt Lindstrom (2006)
 Chuck Lofgren (2007)
 Jordan Lyles (2010)
 Triston McKenzie (2017)
 Michael Madsen (2007)
 Paul Maholm (2005)
 John Maine (2003)
 Matt Manning (2018)
 Ryan Mattheus (2008)
 Brian Matusz (2009)
 Trevor May (2014)
 Alex Meyer (2012; 2014)
 Adam Miller (2006)
 Shelby Miller (2010–2011)
 Mike Minor (2010)
 Matt Moore (2011)
 Mark Mulder (1999)
 Bill Murphy (2004)
 Joe Musgrove (2016)
 Brett Myers (2001–2002)
 Clint Nageotte (2003)
 Chris Narveson (2003)
 Jimmy Nelson (2013)
 Nick Neugebauer (2001)
 Sean Newcomb (2015)
 Jeff Niemann (2007)
 Aaron Nola (2015)
 Daniel Norris (2014)
 Jake Odorizzi (2012)
 Garrett Olson (2007)
 Andy Oliver (2010)
 Henry Owens (2014)
 Jarrod Parker (2009)
 Troy Patton (2005)
 Brad Peacock (2011)
 Josh Pearce (2001)
 C. D. Pelham (2018)
 Brad Penny (1999)
 Kyle Peterson (1999)
 Drew Pomeranz (2011)
 Kevin Pucetas (2008)
 A. J. Puk (2017)
 Nick Pereira (2006)
 Anthony Ranaudo (2013)
 Colin Rea (2015)
 Trevor Reckling (2009)
 Clayton Richard (2008)
 C. J. Riefenhauser (2013)
 Matt Riley (1999)
 Royce Ring (2003)
 Grant Roberts (2000)
 B. J. Ryan (1999)
 CC Sabathia (2000)
 Tanner Scheppers (2010)
 Tanner Scott (2017)
 Ben Sheets (2000)
 Justus Sheffield (2018)
 Braden Shipley (2014)
 Tyler Skaggs (2011–2012)
 Kyle Sleeth (2004)
 Nate Smith (2016)
 Blake Snell (2015)
 Ian Snell (2005)
 Tim Stauffer (2004)
 Richard Stahl (2001)
 Ryne Stanek (2016)
 Robert Stephenson (2014)
 Billy Sylvester (2001)
 Noah Syndergaard (2013–2014)
 Jameson Taillon (2012)
 Dennis Tankersley (2001)
 Brad Thompson (2004)
 Jake Thompson (2014)
 Tyler Thornburg (2011)
 Jess Todd (2008)
 Billy Traber (2002)
 Jacob Turner (2011)
 John Van Benschoten (2003)
 Justin Verlander (2005)
 Adam Wainwright (2002)
 Taijuan Walker (2012–2013)
 Casey Weathers (2008)
 Kip Wells (1999)
 Zack Wheeler (2010; 2012)
 Forrest Whitley (2018)
 Matt White (1999)
 Jerome Williams (2001)
 Kyle Wright (2018)
 Jason Young (2001–2002)
 Barry Zito (1999)
 Joel Zumaya (2005)

Catchers
 
 Bryan Anderson (2007–2008)
 Rob Brantly (2012)
 John Buck (2002)
 Kevin Cash (2002)
 Jason Castro (2009)
 Giuseppe Chiaramonte (1999)
 Zack Collins (2017)
 Hank Conger (2010)
 Kyle Farmer (2015)
 Tyler Flowers (2009)
 Ryan Garko (2005)
 Toby Hall (2001)
 Austin Hedges (2013)
 Koyie Hill (2004)
 J. R. House (2001)
 Chris Iannetta (2005)
 Brandon Inge (2000)
 Danny Jansen (2018)
 Tommy Joseph (2012)
 Carson Kelly (2016)
 Lou Marson (2008)
 Jeff Mathis (2003–2004)
 Joe Mauer (2003)
 James McCann (2013)
 Devin Mesoraco (2011)
 Sean Murphy (2018)
 Justin O'Conner (2014)
 Ben Petrick (1999–2000)
 Josh Phegley (2013)
 Kevin Plawecki (2014)
 Austin Romine (2010–2011)
 Tony Sanchez (2010)
 Kyle Schwarber (2015)
 Chance Sisco (2016–2017)
 Kurt Suzuki (2006)
 Taylor Teagarden (2008)
 J. R. Towles (2007)
 Neil Walker (2006)
 Josh Willingham (2005)

Infielders

 Peter Alonso (2018)
 Pedro Álvarez (2009)
 Brian Anderson (2017)
 Nolan Arenado (2011–2012)
 Michael Aubrey (2004)
 Josh Barfield (2003; 2005)
 Daric Barton (2005)
 Josh Bell (2014–2015)
 Mookie Betts (2014)
 Bo Bichette (2017–2018)
 Alex Bregman (2016)
 Kris Bryant (2014)
 Hank Blalock (2001)
 Brian Bocock (2007)
 Ryan Braun (2006)
 Russell Branyan (1999)
 Chris Burke (2003–2004)
 Pat Burrell (1999)
 Sean Burroughs (2000–2001)
 Brent Butler (2001)
 Willie Calhoun (2016)
 Adrian Cárdenas (2007)
 Chris Carter (2009)
 Nick Castellanos (2012)
 Garin Cecchini (2013)
 Lonnie Chisenhall (2010)
 Chris Coghlan (2007)
 Sean Coyle (2014)
 J. P. Crawford (2014–2015)
 C. J. Cron (2013)
 Michael Cuddyer (1999)
 Drew Cumberland (2010)
 Jamie D'Antona (2008)
 Chase d'Arnaud (2011–2012)
 James Darnell (2011)
 Matt Davidson (2013)
 Chris Davis (2008)
 Travis Dawkins (2000)
 Travis Demeritte (2016)
 Delino DeShields Jr. (2013)
 Jason Donald (2008)
 Hunter Dozier (2016)
 Kelly Dransfeldt (1999)
 Stephen Drew (2006)
 Danny Espinosa (2009–2010)
 Prince Fielder (2004)
 Josh Fields (2006)
 Joey Gallo (2013–2014)
 Mat Gamel (2008)
 Scooter Gennett (2012)
 Chris Getz (2008)
 Marcus Giles (2000)
 Paul Goldschmidt (2011)
 Adrián González (2001)
 Alex Gordon (2006)
 Dee Gordon (2010)
 Nick Gordon (2017)
 Grant Green (2010–2011)
 Khalil Greene (2003)
 Bill Hall (2002)
 J. J. Hardy (2003)
 Corey Hart (2002)
 Ke'Bryan Hayes (2018)
 Ryon Healy (2016)
 Drew Henson (2000; 2002)
 Aaron Hill (2004)
 Keston Hiura (2018)
 Wes Hodges (2008)
 Rhys Hoskins (2017)
 Eric Hosmer (2010)
 Ryan Howard (2003)
 Orlando Hudson (2002)
 Nick Johnson (1999; 2001)
 Tony Kemp (2015)
 Carter Kieboom (2018)
 Scott Kingery (2017)
 Jason Kipnis (2011)
 Joe Koshansky (2006)
 Howie Kendrick (2006)
 Adam Kennedy (1999)
 Matt LaPorta (2008)
 Adam LaRoche (2003)
 Andy LaRoche (2005)
 Joe Lawrence (1999)
 Brent Lillibridge (2007)
 Evan Longoria (2007)
 Nathaniel Lowe (2018)
 Manny Machado (2011–2012)
 Ryan McMahon (2017)
 Dallas McPherson (2004)
 Will Middlebrooks (2011)
 Brad Miller (2013)
 Scott Moore (2005)
 Logan Morrison (2010)
 Ryan Mountcastle (2018)
 Mike Moustakas (2010)
 Eric Munson (2000)
 Micah Johnson (2014)
 Peter O'Brien (2014)
 Matt Olson (2015)
 Lyle Overbay (2002)
 Chris Owings (2013)
 Eric Patterson (2006)
 Steve Pearce (2007)
 Cliff Pennington (2008)
 D. J. Peterson (2014)
 Brandon Phillips (2002)
 Cody Ransom (2001)
 Colby Rasmus (2007)
 Brendan Rodgers (2017–2018)
 Jason Romano (2000)
 Addison Russell (2013)
 Marcus Sanders (2005)
 Corey Seager (2014)
 Nick Senzel (2017)
 Richie Shaffer (2015)
 Jon Singleton (2012)
 Scott Sizemore (2009)
 Dominic Smith (2016)
 Ian Stewart (2007)
 Jason Stokes (2002)
 Trevor Story (2015)
 Dansby Swanson (2016)
 Chad Tracy (2002)
 Troy Tulowitzki (2006)
 Trea Turner (2015)
 B. J. Upton (2004–2005)
 Justin Upton (2007)
 Chase Utley (2001)
 Chris Valaika (2008)
 Josh Vitters (2009)
 Christian Walker (2013)
 Brett Wallace (2009)
 Jemile Weeks (2009)
 Rickie Weeks Jr. (2004)
 Johnny Whittleman (2007)
 Kolten Wong (2012–2013)
 Brandon Wood (2005)
 David Wright (2004)
 Kevin Youkilis (2003)
 Eric Young Jr. (2009)

Outfielders
 
 Jo Adell (2018)
 Tyler Austin (2012)
 Andrew Benintendi (2016)
 Peter Bergeron (1999)
 Lance Berkman (1999)
 Joe Borchard (2001–2002)
 Lewis Brinson (2017)
 Dee Brown (1999)
 Domonic Brown (2010)
 Gary Brown (2011)
 Jay Bruce (2007)
 Travis Buck (2006)
 Billy Butler (2006)
 Byron Buxton (2013)
 Marlon Byrd (2002)
 Michael Choice (2012)
 Carl Crawford (2002)
 Michael Conforto (2015)
 Dylan Cozens (2016)
 Jack Cust (2000)
 David Dahl (2016)
 Adam Dunn (2001)
 Jacoby Ellsbury (2007)
 Derek Fisher (2017)
 Dexter Fowler (2008)
 Jeff Francoeur (2005)
 Clint Frazier (2016)
 Greg Golson (2008)
 Anthony Gose (2012)
 Billy Hamilton (2012–2013)
 Josh Hamilton (2000)
 Bryce Harper (2011)
 Chris Heisey (2009)
 Jeremy Hermida (2005)
 Jason Heyward (2009)
 Brett Jackson (2010)
 Conor Jackson (2004–2005)
 Desmond Jennings (2009)
 Daryl Jones (2009)
 Aaron Judge (2015)
 Alex Kirilloff (2018)
 David Kelton (2003)
 Dave Krynzel (2003)
 Jason Kubel (2004)
 Jason Lane (2001)
 Kyle Lewis (2018)
 Ryan Ludwick (2001)
 Val Majewski (2004)
 Cameron Maybin (2006–2007)
 Andrew McCutchen (2008)
 Austin Meadows (2016)
 Lastings Milledge (2005)
 Wil Myers (2011–2012)
 Brandon Nimmo (2013, 2015)
 Mike Olt (2012)
 Corey Patterson (1999–2000)
 Joc Pederson (2013)
 Hunter Pence (2006)
 James Ramsey (2014) 
 Corey Ray (2017)
 Buddy Reed (2018)
 Jeremy Reed (2004)
 Hunter Renfroe (2014; 2016)
 Bryan Reynolds (2017)
 Nolan Reimold (2006)
 Michael Restovich (2002)
 Ben Revere (2010)
 Nate Schierholtz (2008)
 Grady Sizemore (2003)
 Stephen Smitherman (2003)
 Denard Span (2008)
 George Springer (2013)
 Giancarlo Stanton (2009)
 Christin Stewart (2016)
 Jamal Strong (2001)
 Matt Szczur (2011)
 Michael A. Taylor (2014)
 Joey Terdoslavich (2013)
 Taylor Trammell (2018)
 Mike Trout (2010–2011)
 Kyle Tucker (2017)
 Kyle Waldrop (2015)
 Vernon Wells (1999–2000)
 Brad Wilkerson (2000)
 Nick Williams (2015)
 Jesse Winker (2014)
 Christian Yelich (2012–2013)
 Chris Young (2005)
 Delmon Young (2004–2005)
 Bradley Zimmer (2015)

World team (1999–2018)

Pitchers
 
 Domingo Acevedo (2017)
 Alfonso Alcantara (2014) 
 Edwin Almonte (2002)
 Miguel Almonte (2013)
 Henderson Álvarez (2010–2011)
 Yadier Álvarez (2017)
 Craig Anderson (2000)
 Tony Armas Jr. (1999)
 Phillippe Aumont (2008)
 Danys Báez (2000)
 Grant Balfour (2001)
 Manny Banuelos (2009)
 Jaime Barría (2017)
 Denny Bautista (2003)
 Pedro Beato (2007)
 Érik Bédard (2001–2002)
 Francis Beltrán (2002)
 José Berríos (2014–2015)
 Travis Blackley (2003)
 Lisalverto Bonilla (2012)
 Edwar Cabrera (2012)
 Fernando Cabrera (2005)
 José Capellán (2004) 
 Carlos Carrasco (2006–2008)
 Santiago Casilla (2004)
 Simón Castro (2010)
 Jhoulys Chacín (2009)
 Carlos Contreras (2013)
 Francisco Cordero (1999)
 Jharel Cotton (2016)
 Juan Cruz (2001)
 Jorge de la Rosa (2002–2003)
 Enyel De Los Santos (2018)
 Fautino de los Santos (2007)
 Jesús Delgado (2008)
 Rafael De Paula (2013)
 Edwin Díaz (2015)
 Randey Dorame (2000)
 Edwin Escobar (2014)
 Luis Escobar (2017)
 Jeurys Familia (2010)
 Michael Feliz (2014) 
 Neftalí Feliz (2009)
 José Fernández (2012)
 Yohan Flande (2009)
 Jeff Francis (2004)
 Juan Francisco (2008)
 Emiliano Fruto (2007)
 Yovani Gallardo (2006)
 Gerardo García (2002)
 Jaime García (2006; 2008)
 Jarlin García (2015)
 José García (2006)
 Domingo Germán (2014)
 Édgar González (2003)
 Juan González (2015)
 Deolis Guerra (2007)
 Tayron Guerrero (2014, 2017)
 Jorge Guzmán (2018)
 Rich Harden (2003)
 Liam Hendriks (2010–2011)
 Carlos Hernández (2000–2001)
 Félix Hernández (2004)
 Jonathan Hernández (2017)
 Fausto Carmona (2004–2005)
 Alex Herrera (2001)
 Kelvin Herrera (2011)
 Shawn Hill (2003)
 Chih-Wei Hu (2016)
 Wei-Chieh Huang (2015)
 Gregory Infante (2011)
 Joe Jiménez (2015–2016)
 Sun-woo Kim (1999–2000)
 Jairo Labourt (2015, 2017)
 Wilfredo Ledezma (2004)
 C. C. Lee (2013)
 Serguey Linares (2007)
 Francisco Liriano (2002; 2005)
 Radhames Liz (2006)
 Chia-Jen Lo (2009)
 Adam Loewen (2005)
 Jorge López (2014)
 Reynaldo López (2016)
 Yoan López (2018)
 Kyle Lotzkar (2012)
 Kieran Lovegrove (2018)
 Jesus Luzardo (2018)
 Bryan Mata (2018)
 Trystan Magnuson (2010)
 Jhan Mariñez (2011)
 Carlos Martínez (2011)
 Edgar R. Martínez (2006)
 Shairon Martis (2008)
 Scott Mathieson (2005)
 Chris Mears (1999)
 Adalberto Mejía (2016)
 Jenrry Mejía (2009)
 Keury Mella (2015)
 Frankie Montas (2014–2015)
 Rafael Montero (2013)
 Franklin Morales (2007)
 Juan Morillo (2005)
 Eduardo Morlan (2008)
 Arnie Muñoz (2004)
 Aaron Myette (1999–2000)
 Dovydas Neverauskas (2016)
 Fernando Nieve (2005)
 Héctor Noesí (2010)
 Tomo Ohka (1999–2000)
 Ramón Ortiz (1999–2000)
 James Paxton (2011)
 Ariel Peña (2012)
 Juan Peña (2001)
 Ángel Perdomo (2016)
 Luis Perdomo (2015)
 Luis Pérez (2009)
 Martín Pérez (2011)
 Juan Pérez (2004)
 Yusmeiro Petit (2004–2005)
 Julio Pimentel (2008)
 Stolmy Pimentel (2010)
 Joel Piñeiro (2001)
 Ricardo Pinto (2016)
 Luke Prokopec (1999)
 Cal Quantrill (2017)
 Chris Reed (2012)
 Alex Reyes (2015–2016)
 André Rienzo (2013)
 Francisco Ríos (2016)
 Felipe Rivero (2012)
 Eduardo Rodríguez (2013)
 Francisco Rodríguez (2002)
 Henry Rodríguez (2008)
 Julio Rodríguez (2021)
 Ricardo Rodríguez (2001–2002)
 Wilfredo Rodríguez (2000)
 Davis Romero (2006)
 Enny Romero (2012–2014)
 J. C. Romero (1999)
 Bruce Rondón (2012)
 Jae Kuk Ryu (2006)
 Fernando Salas (2008)
 Juan Salas (2006)
 Aníbal Sánchez (2005)
 Eduardo Sánchez (2010)
 Humberto Sánchez (2006)
 Ervin Santana (2003)
 Jae Seo (2001)
 Leyson Séptimo (2009)
 Wascar Serrano (1999)
 Luis Severino (2014)
 Carlos Silva (2000)
 Seung Song (2001–2003)
 Mike Soroka (2017)
 Henry Sosa (2007)
 John Stephens (2002)
 J. C. Sulbaran (2009)
 Lewis Thorpe (2018)
 Julio Teherán (2010–2011)
 Brad Thomas (2001)
 Rich Thompson (2007)
 Jesús Tinoco (2018)
 Polin Trinidad (2008)
 Chin-hui Tsao (2000; 2003)
 Dylan Unsworth (2016)
 Julio Urías (2014)
 Merkin Valdéz (2003–2005)
 Philippe Valiquette (2010)
 José Valverde (2001)
 Rick van den Hurk (2007)
 Yordano Ventura (2012–2013)
 Thyago Vieira (2017)
 Arodys Vizcaíno (2011)
 Edinson Vólquez (2005)
 Chien-Ming Wang (2003)
 Alex Wells (2018)
 Michael Ynoa (2013)

Catchers
 
 Jorge Alfaro (2013–2014)
 Miguel Amaya (2018)
 Christian Bethancourt (2012–2013)
 Javier Cardona (1999)
 Welington Castillo (2008)
 Ramón Castro (2000)
 Chun Chen (2010)
 Humberto Cota (2001)
 Elías Díaz (2015)
 Robinzon Díaz (2004, 2007)
 Yasmani Grandal (2012)
 A. J. Jiménez (2013–2014)
 George Kottaras (2006)
 César King (1999)
 Salomón Manríquez (2006)
 Russell Martin (2005)
 Víctor Martínez (2002)
 Francisco Mejía (2016–2018)
 Jesús Montero (2008–2009)
 Miguel Montero (2005)
 Dioner Navarro (2004)
 Tomas Nido (2017)
 Miguel Olivo (2000)
 Guillermo Quiróz (2003)
 Max Ramírez (2007–2008)
 Mike Rivera (2001)
 Wilin Rosario (2010–2011)
 Keibert Ruiz (2018)
 Gary Sánchez (2015–2016)
 Carlos Santana (2009)
 Alí Solís (2012)
 Geovany Soto (2007)
 Sebastián Valle (2011)
 Christian Vázquez (2014)

Infielders

 Willy Adames (2016)
 Jesús Aguilar (2012)
 Ozhaino Albies (2015)
 José Altuve (2011)
 Arismendy Alcántara (2013)
 Yordan Álvarez (2017–2018)
 Alfredo Amézaga (2001)
 Elvis Andrus (2007–2008)
 Joaquín Arias (2006)
 Orlando Arcia (2015)
 Carlos Asuaje (2016)
 Pedro Báez (2009–2010)
 Javier Báez (2014)
 William Bergolla (2005)
 Ángel Berroa (2001–2002)
 Yuniesky Betancourt (2005)
 Wilson Betemit (2001)
 Andrés Blanco (2004)
 Xander Bogaerts (2012–2013)
 Emilio Bonifacio (2008)
 Miguel Cabrera (2001–2002)
 Scott Campbell (2008)
 Jeimer Candelario (2016)
 Bárbaro Cañizares (2009)
 Robinson Canó (2003–2004)
 José Castillo (1999; 2003)
 Starlin Castro (2009)
 Yung Chi Chen (2006)
 Hee-seop Choi (2002)
 Ji-man Choi (2013)
 Pedro Ciriaco (2010)
 Carlos Correa (2013–2014)
 Jesús Cota (2004)
 Luis Cruz (2006)
 Rafael Devers (2015, 2017)
 Erubiel Durazo (1999)
 Iván DeJesús Jr. (2008)
 Víctor Díaz (2002)
 Yandy Díaz (2016)
 Mauricio Dubón (2017)
 Germán Durán (2007)
 Edwin Encarnación (2003–2005)
 Alcides Escobar (2007, 2009)
 Yunel Escobar (2006)
 Wilmer Flores (2009; 2012)
 Lucius Fox (2017)
 Maikel Franco (2013–2014)
 Rafael Furcal (1999)
 Luis García (2001)
 Luis García (2018)
 Franklyn Germán (2002)
 Tyson Gillies (2009)
 Andrés Giménez (2018)
 Alexis Gómez (1999; 2003)
 Rubén Gotay (2004)
 Vladimir Guerrero Jr. (2017)
 Joel Guzmán (2004; 2006)
 Ronald Guzmán (2016)
 John Hattig (2005)
 Dilson Herrera (2013; 2016)
 Rosell Herrera (2014)
 Chin-lung Hu (2006–2007)
 Justin Huber (2002–2003; 2005)
 Luke Hughes (2008)
 Omar Infante (2002)
 Hernán Iribarren (2005)
 Luis Jiménez (2010)
 Max Kepler (2015)
 Pete Laforest (1999)
 Brett Lawrie (2009–2010)
 Hak-ju Lee (2010–2011)
 Jordan Lennerton (2013)
 José León (2000)
 Alex Liddi (2009–2011)
 Francisco Lindor (2012–2014)
 Felipe López (2000–2001)
 José López (2002)
 Dawel Lugo (2018)
 Andy Marte (2003–2004)
 Jefry Marté (2011)
 Ketel Marte (2015)
 Francisco Martinez (2011)
 Ozzie Martínez (2010)
 Jorge Mateo (2016)
 Yoan Moncada (2016)
 Adalberto Mondesí (2015)
 Kendrys Morales (2005)
 Justin Morneau (2002; 2004)
 Josh Naylor (2016)
 Ramón Nivar (1999; 2003)
 Renato Núñez (2014–2015)
 Pablo Ozuna (1999)
 Chih-Fang Pan (2012)
 Carlos Peña (2000–2001)
 Ramiro Peña (2008)
 José Peraza (2014)
 Calvin Pickering (1999)
 Jurickson Profar (2011–2012)
 Aramis Ramírez (1999)
 Hanley Ramírez (2005)
 José Reyes (2002)
 José Rondón (2014)
 Amed Rosario (2016)
 Rubén Salazar (2000)
 Carlos Sánchez (2012)
 Freddy Sandoval (2007)
 Pablo Sandoval (2006; 2008)
 Miguel Sanó (2013)
 Jonathan Schoop (2011)
 Jean Segura (2012)
 Alfonso Soriano (1999)
 Craig Stansberry (2007)
 Evert-Jan 't Hoen (1999)
 Fernando Tatis Jr. (2018)
 Scott Thorman (1999)
 Luis Urías (2018)
 Travis Wilson (2000)
 Kennys Vargas (2014)
 Dayán Viciedo (2009; 2011)
 Angel Villalona (2008–2009)
 Joey Votto (2006–2007)
 Julio Zuleta (2000)

Outfielders

 Ronald Acuña (2017)
 Yonder Alonso (2010–2011)
 Dariel Álvarez (2014)
 Tony Álvarez (2002)
 Oswaldo Arcia (2012)
 Randy Arozarena (2018)
 Yeison Asencio (2013)
 Luis Alexander Basabe (2018)
 Wladimir Balentien (2006–2007)
 Tony Blanco (2004)
 Jorge Bonifacio (2016)
 Socrates Brito (2015)
 Melky Cabrera (2005)
 Chin-Feng Chen (1999–2000)
 Chih-Hsien Chiang (2011)
 Shin-Soo Choo (2002; 2004–2005)
 Jorge Cortés (2004)
 Nelson Cruz (2005)
 Frank Díaz (2005)
 Yusniel Díaz (2018)
 Luis Durango (2009)
 Alex Escobar (2000–2001)
 Estevan Florial (2017)
 Rey Fuentes (2011; 2013)
 Jesús Galindo (2013)
 Anderson Gomes (2006)
 Carlos González (2006–2007)
 Franklin Gutiérrez (2003)
 Jae-hoon Ha (2012)
 Gorkys Hernández (2007–2008; 2010)
 Eloy Jimenez (2016–2017)
 Kyeong Kang (2009)
 Che-hsuan Lin (2008)
 Rymer Liriano (2012)
 Manuel Margot (2015–2016)
 Alfredo Marte (2012)
 Starling Marte (2011)
 Seuly Matias (2018)
 Fernando Martínez (2007–2008)
 Nomar Mazara (2015)
 Jackson Melián (2000)
 Steven Moya (2014)
 Ntema Ndungidi (2000)
 Tyler O'Neill (2016)
 Trent Oeltjen (2006)
 Bill Ortega (2001)
 Gerardo Parra (2008)
 Carlos Peguero (2010)
 Francisco Peguero (2010)
 Wily Mo Peña (2001–2002)
 Eury Pérez (2010)
 Félix Pie (2003–2004)
 Gregory Polanco (2013)
 Dalton Pompey (2014)
 Wilkin Ramírez (2008; 2010)
 Heliot Ramos (2018)
 René Reyes (1999)
 Alex Ríos (2003)
 Juan Rivera (2001)
 Víctor Robles (2017)
 Yorman Rodríguez (2015)
 Wilkin Ruan (2001)
 Alex Sánchez (1999)
 Jesus Sánchez (2018)
 Domingo Santana (2014)
 Luis Saturria (2000)
 Michael Saunders (2007)
 Alfredo Silverio (2011)
 Jorge Soler (2013)
 José Tábata (2006)
 Raimel Tapia (2015–2016)
 Leody Taveras (2018)
 Oscar Taveras (2012–2013)
 Willy Taveras (2004)
 Jorge Toca (1999)
 Goef Tomlinson (1999)
 Andrés Torres (2002)
 Rene Tosoni (2009)
 Henry Urrutia (2013)
 Jimmy Van Ostrand (2008)
 Alex Verdugo (2017)
 Nick Weglarz (2009)

American League (2019–present)

Pitchers

Jordan Balazovic (2019)
Shane Baz (2021)
Brayan Bello (2021)
J. B. Bukauskas (2019)
Reid Detmers (2021)
Marcos Diplán (2021)
Justin Dunn (2019)
Deivi García (2019)
DL Hall (2019)
Emerson Hancock (2021)
Matt Manning (2019)
Brendan McKay (2019)
Luis Medina (2021)
Nate Pearson (2019)
Cole Ragans (2021)
Grayson Rodriguez (2019)
Brady Singer (2019)
Josh Winder (2021)
Cole Winn (2021)
Héctor Yan (2021)

Catchers
 
Ronaldo Hernández (2019)
Sam Huff (2019)
Bo Naylor (2021)
Jake Rogers (2019)
Adley Rutschman (2021)
Tyler Soderstrom (2021)

Infielders

Vidal Bruján (2021)
Jake Burger (2021)
Jeter Downs (2021)
Xavier Edwards (2021)
Wander Franco (2019)
Nolan Jones (2019)
Royce Lewis (2019)
Nick Madrigal (2019)
Austin Martin (2021)
Jorge Mateo (2019)
Isaac Paredes (2019)
Nick Pratto (2021)
Spencer Torkelson (2021)
Evan White (2019)
Bobby Witt Jr. (2021)

Outfielders
 
Jo Adell (2019)
Yoelqui Céspedes (2021)
Jasson Domínguez (2021)
Jarren Duran (2019)
Riley Greene (2021)
Daniel Johnson (2019)
Jarred Kelenic (2019, 2021)
Pedro León (2021)
Luis Robert (2019)
Julio Y. Rodríguez (2021)

National League (2019–present)

Pitchers
 
Adbert Alzolay (2019)
Ian Anderson (2019)
Ben Bowden (2019)
Cade Cavalli (2021)
Roansy Contreras (2021)
Jake Eder (2021)
MacKenzie Gore (2019)
Andre Jackson (2021)
Anthony Kay (2019)
Matthew Liberatore (2021)
Nick Lodolo (2021)
Dustin May (2019)
Max Meyer (2021)
Adrián Morejón (2019)
Luis Patiño (2019)
Quinn Priester (2021)
Manuel Rodríguez (2021)
Sixto Sánchez (2019)
Ethan Small (2021)
Devin Williams (2019)

Catchers

Francisco Álvarez (2021)
Miguel Amaya (2019)
Joey Bart (2019)
Luis Campusano (2021)
Willie MacIver (2021)
Daulton Varsho (2019)

Infielders

C. J. Abrams (2021)
Brett Baty (2021)
Alec Bohm (2019)
Michael Busch (2021)
Will Craig (2019)
Isan Díaz (2019)
Nolan Gorman (2019, 2021)
Carter Kieboom (2019)
Marco Luciano (2021)
Gavin Lux (2019)
Bryson Stott (2021)
Michael Toglia (2021)

Outfielders
 
Dylan Carlson (2019)
Brennen Davis (2021)
Michael Harris II (2021)
Monte Harrison (2019)
Cristian Pache (2019)
Heliot Ramos (2019, 2021)
Alek Thomas (2019, 2021)
Taylor Trammell (2019)
Ryan Vilade (2021)
Drew Waters (2021)

Sources

Major League Baseball lists
Futures Game
Futures Game